So Fine is the fifth studio album (and sixth overall) by singer-songwriter duo Loggins and Messina, released in 1975. It consists of a collection of covers of 1950s and 1960s rock, country and rockabilly songs.

Track listing

Side one
"Oh, Lonesome Me" (Don Gibson) – 2:49
"My Baby Left Me" (Arthur "Big Boy" Crudup) – 2:51
"Wake Up Little Susie" (Felice and Boudleaux Bryant) – 2:02
"I'm Movin' On" (Hank Snow) – 3:45
"Hello Mary Lou" (Gene Pitney) – 2:17
"Hey Good Lookin'" (Hank Williams) – 2:35

Side two
"Splish Splash" (Bobby Darin, Murray the K) – 2:20
"A Lover's Question" (Brook Benton, Jimmy Williams) – 3:21
"You Never Can Tell" (Chuck Berry) – 3:14
"I Like It Like That" (Chris Kenner) – 3:06
"So Fine" (Johnny Otis) – 2:37
"Honky Tonk – Part II" (Billy Butler, Bill Doggett, Clifford Scott, Shep Shepherd) – 2:41

Personnel
Kenny Loggins – vocals, rhythm guitar, acoustic guitar, harmonica, banjo
Jim Messina – vocals, lead guitar, acoustic guitar, dobro, mandolin

Loggins and Messina band
Merel Bregante – drums
Jon Clarke – flute, saxophone
Vince Denham – saxophone
Richard Greene – violin
Larry Sims – bass guitar, backing vocals
Don Roberts – saxophone, flute

Sidemen
Michel Rubini – piano
Milt Holland – percussion
Steve Forman – percussion

Production
Producer: Jim Messina
Engineer: Alex Kazanegras
2nd engineer: Jim Messina
Recordist: Corey Bailey
Recording technician: Lew Schatzer
Road managers: Jim Recor, David Cieslak
Personal management: Schiffman & Larson
Equipment managers: Carl Moritz, Steve Semonell
Photography: Jim McCrary, Reid Miles
Design: Ron Coro, Nancy Donald

Charts
Album – Billboard (United States)

References

Loggins and Messina albums
1975 albums
Covers albums
Albums produced by Jim Messina (musician)
Columbia Records albums
Albums with cover art by Reid Miles
Albums recorded in a home studio